Kris Richard (born 20 November 1994) is a Swiss racing driver currently competing in the TCR Europe Series. Having previously competed in the World Touring Car Cup, World Touring Car Championship and European Touring Car Cup amongst others.

Racing career
Richard began his career in 2005 in Karting, he continued in karting until 2008. In 2011 he switched to the Formula LO series, he finished the season seventh in the championship standings that year. He continued in the series for 2012, taking a single victory, several podiums and pole positions on his way to finishing third in the standings. For the 2016 season he switched to the European Touring Car Cup, driving a Honda Civic TCR for Rikli Motorsport. He went on to take five victories, 8 podiums and 1 pole position on his way to winning the 2016 drivers title. He also partnered Stéphane Lémeret in one round of the 2016 TCR BeNeLux Touring Car Championship. For 2017 he switched to the ADAC TCR Germany Touring Car Championship, driving a Honda Civic Type R TCR (FK2) for Target Competition.

In October 2017 it was announced that he would race in the World Touring Car Championship replacing Esteban Guerrieri, driving a Chevrolet RML Cruze TC1 for Campos Racing as a prize for winning the 2016 European Touring Car Cup. He earned a second outing with team at the season finale held in Qatar, scoring his first and only WTCC points by finishing sixth in the second race. In 2018 he made a two one-off starts in the 24H TCE Series and in the VLN. After having competed in the ADAC TCR Germany Touring Car Championship in 2017, he switched to the TCR Europe Series for 2018, once again driving for Target Competition, driving a Hyundai i30 N TCR. He later made a wildcard entry into the 2018 World Touring Car Cup race held at the Nürburgring Nordschleife with KCMG, driving a Honda Civic Type R TCR (FK8).

Racing record

Complete World Touring Car Championship results
(key) (Races in bold indicate pole position) (Races in italics indicate fastest lap)

Complete TCR Europe Series results
(key) (Races in bold indicate pole position) (Races in italics indicate fastest lap)

Complete World Touring Car Cup results
(key) (Races in bold indicate pole position) (Races in italics indicate fastest lap)

References

External links
 
 

1994 births
Living people
World Touring Car Championship drivers
European Touring Car Cup drivers
Swiss racing drivers
Sportspeople from Bern
World Touring Car Cup drivers
Campos Racing drivers
KCMG drivers
Formula Lista Junior drivers
Team Lazarus drivers
Blancpain Endurance Series drivers
Boutsen Ginion Racing drivers
24H Series drivers
TCR Europe Touring Car Series drivers